

General classification

References

Giro di Lombardia
1940 in Italian sport
1940 in road cycling